The Uni-President Lions began their 2007 season by playing against La New Bears at Chengching Lake Baseball Field on March 17. The season concluded in late October, with the Lions winning the Taiwan Series and participating in the Asia Series.

Regular season

|

|-

|- style="background:#fcc;"
||3 / 17||@ La New Bears||4 – 5||Liang Ju-hao||Pan Wei-lun||Huang Chun-chung||10,012
|- style="background:#bfb;"
||3 / 18||@ La New Bears||4 – 1||Rob Cordemans||Horacio Estrada||Tseng Yi-cheng||3,054
|- style="background:#fcc;"
||3 / 22||Chinatrust Whales||7 – 9||Miguel Saladin||Kao Lung-wei||Ni Fu-deh||1,820
|- style="background:#fcc;"
||3 / 23||Chinatrust Whales||4 – 5||Du Chang-wei||Pan Wei-lun||Miguel Saladin||1,207
|- style="background:#fcc;"
||3 / 24||La New Bears||1 – 5||Gary Rath||Jeriome Robertson||||3,008
|- style="background:#fcc;"
||3 / 25||La New Bears||1 – 6||Horacio Estrada||Rob Cordemans||Huang Chun-chung||2,734
|- style="background:#bbb;"
| 3 / 27||Brother Elephants|| colspan=5|Postponed Rescheduled for June 19
|- style="background:#fcc;"
||3 / 28||Brother Elephants||0 – 4||Joey Dawley||Tsao Chun-yang||Chuang Wei-chuan||2,032
|- style="background:#bfb;"
||3 / 31||@ Macoto Cobras||11 – 5||Pan Wei-lun||Diegomar Markwell||||2,275
|-

|- style="background:#fcc;"
||4 / 1||@ Macoto Cobras||6 – 9||Lee Min-chin||Shen Po-tsang||Travis Minix||2,115
|- style="background:#bfb;"
||4 / 3||@ Chinatrust Whales||4 – 2||Rob Cordemans||Shen Yu-chieh||Kao Lung-wei||508
|- style="background:#bfb;"
||4 / 4||@ Chinatrust Whales||9 – 8||Tseng Yi-cheng||Ni Fu-deh||Kao Lung-wei||618
|- style="background:#fcc;"
||4 / 5||@ Brother Elephants||10 – 11||Yeh Ting-jen||Kao Lung-wei||||6,525
|- style="background:#fcc;"
||4 / 6||@ Brother Elephants||1 – 5||Nick Bierbrodt||Jeriome Robertson||Chuang Wei-chuan||4,793
|- style="background:#fcc;"
||4 / 10||Macoto Cobras||7 – 15||Kléber Ojima||Rob Cordemans||||1,026
|- style="background:#fcc;"
||4 / 11||Macoto Cobras||2 – 6||Huang Chin-chih||Jeriome Robertson||||1,167
|- style="background:#fcc;"
||4 / 14||@ Sinon Bulls||1 – 2||Hiroshi Shibakusa||Pete Munro||Kuo Yung-chih||2,543
|- style="background:#fcc;"
||4 / 15||@ Sinon Bulls||0 – 5||Yang Chien-fu||Chang Chih-chiang||||3,017
|- style="background:#bfb;"
||4 / 19||Sinon Bulls||4 – 3||Pan Wei-lun||Alfredo Gonzalez||Lin Cheng-feng||1,195
|- style="background:#fcc;"
||4 / 20||Sinon Bulls||0 – 2||Yang Chien-fu||Pete Munro||Kuo Yung-chih||2,173
|- style="background:#bfb;"
||4 / 21||Chinatrust Whales||7 – 1||Rob Cordemans||Tseng Chao-hao||||2,048
|- style="background:#bfb;"
||4 / 22||Chinatrust Whales||20 – 5||Tsao Chun-yang||Kao Chien-san||||2,077
|- style="background:#bfb;"
||4 / 26||Brother Elephants||1 – 0||Pete Munro||Wang Chin-li||||2,543
|- style="background:#fcc;"
||4 / 27||Brother Elephants||9 – 12||Liu Chun-nan||Rob Cordemans||Chuang Wei-chuan||3,265
|- style="background:#fcc;"
||4 / 28||Sinon Bulls||1 – 13||Tomokazu Iba||Jeriome Robertson||||3,026
|- style="background:#bfb;"
||4 / 29||Sinon Bulls||4 – 2||Pan Wei-lun||Lee Kuo-ching||Pan Chun-jung||3,062
|-

|- style="background:#bfb;"
||5 / 3||@ Macoto Cobras||5 – 2||Tsao Chun-yang||Lee Min-chin||Kao Lung-wei||1,233
|- style="background:#fcc;"
||5 / 4||@ Macoto Cobras||4 – 10||Chang Hsien-chih||Jeriome Robertson||||1,167
|- style="background:#bfb;"
||5 / 10||La New Bears||5 – 1||Pan Wei-lun||Luis Martinez||||2,004
|- style="background:#bfb;"
||5 / 11||La New Bears||7 – 2||Pete Munro||Gary Rath||||2,057
|- style="background:#fcc;"
||5 / 12||Brother Elephants||6 – 13||Liu Chun-nan||Rob Cordemans||||4,117
|- style="background:#bfb;"
||5 / 13||Brother Elephants||6 – 5||Tsao Chun-yang||Chuang Wei-chuan||||5,079
|- style="background:#bfb;"
||5 / 15||@ Macoto Cobras||11 – 7||Pan Chun-jung||Lee Min-chin||||858
|- style="background:#bfb;"
||5 / 16||@ Macoto Cobras||19 – 6||Pan Wei-lun||Chang Hsien-chih||||938
|- style="background:#bfb;"
||5 / 17||@ Chinatrust Whales||3 – 2||Tsao Chun-yang||Ni Fu-deh||Shen Po-tsang||608
|- style="background:#bbb;"
||5 / 18||@ Chinatrust Whales||colspan=5|Postponed Rescheduled for June 21
|- style="background:#bbb;"
||5 / 22||@ Sinon Bulls||colspan=5|Postponed Rescheduled for June 22
|- style="background:#bbb;"
||5 / 23||@ Sinon Bulls||colspan=5|Postponed Rescheduled for June 24
|- style="background:#bfb;"
||5 / 24||@ La New Bears||10 – 2||Pete Munro||Hsu Wen-hsiung||||2,094
|- style="background:#bfb;"
||5 / 25||@ La New Bears||3 – 0||Pan Wei-lun||Luis Martinez||Rob Cordemans||3,776
|- style="background:#bfb;"
||5 / 31||Chinatrust Whales||5 – 1||Pete Munro||Lorenzo Barceló||||1,111
|-

|- style="background:#bfb;"
||6 / 1||Chinatrust Whales||9 – 6||Pan Wei-lun||Chris Mowday||Tsao Chun-yang||1,662
|- style="background:#bbb;"
| 6 / 5||@ La New Bears|| colspan=5|Postponed Rescheduled for June 7
|- style="background:#fcc;"
||6 / 6||@ La New Bears||8 – 14||Hsu Yu-wei||Pete Munro||||2,138
|- style="background:#bbb;"
| 6 / 7||@ La New Bears|| colspan=5|Postponed Rescheduled for June 23
|- style="background:#bfb;"
||6 / 9||Macoto Cobras||20 – 3||Pan Wei-lun||José Rodríguez||||1,487
|- style="background:#fcc;"
||6 / 10||Macoto Cobras||0 – 2||Jeremy Hill||Wayne Franklin||Andy Van Hekken||2,221
|- style="background:#bbb;"
| 6 / 12||@ Brother Elephants|| colspan=5|Postponed Rescheduled for June 26
|- style="background:#fcc;"
||6 / 13||@ Brother Elephants||0 – 3||Joey Dawley||Pete Munro||Todd Moser||2,041
|- style="background:#fcc;"
||6 / 16||@ Sinon Bulls||2 – 5||Yusuke Kurita||Wayne Franklin||Alfredo Gonzalez||3,545
|- style="background:#bfb;"
||6 / 17||@ Sinon Bulls||6 – 1||Pan Wei-lun||Yang Chien-fu||||2,303
|- style="background:#fcc;"
||6 / 19||Brother Elephants||2 – 5||Todd Moser||Pan Chun-jung||Wang Chin-li||2,531
|- style="background:#bfb;"
||6 / 21||@ Chinatrust Whales||2 – 1||Wayne Franklin||Ni Fu-deh||Tsao Chun-yang||409
|- style="background:#bfb;"
||6 / 22||@ Sinon Bulls||3 – 2||Chang Chih-chiang||Lee Kuo-ching||Tsao Chun-yang||1,420
|- style="background:#bfb;"
||6 / 23||@ La New Bears||8 – 5||Lin Cheng-feng||Gary Rath||||1,315
|- style="background:#bfb;"
||6 / 24||@ Sinon Bulls||11 – 2||Pete Munro||Yusuke Kurita||Yen Chun-hao||1,344
|- style="background:#bbb;"
| 6 / 26||@ Brother Elephants|| colspan=5|Postponed Rescheduled for June 28
|- style="background:#bfb;"
||6 / 28||@ Brother Elephants||10 – 3||Shen Po-tsang||Wang Chin-li||||1,029
|- style="background:#bfb;"
||6 / 29||Brother Elephants|||9 – 2||Pete Munro||Nick Bierbrodt|||||2,575
|- style="background:#fcc;"
||6 / 30||Chinatrust Whales||8 – 9||Kevin Tolar||Tsao Chun-yang||||1,689
|-

|- style="background:#ffe6bd;"
||7 / 1||Chinatrust Whales||9 – 9||||||||2,006
|- style="background:#bfb;"
||7 / 3||@ La New Bears||9 – 2||Pan Wei-lun||Randy Leek||||1,899
|- style="background:#fcc;"
||7 / 4||@ La New Bears||5 – 6||Tsai Ying-feng||Shen Po-tsang||||1,749
|- style="background:#fcc;"
||7 / 5||@ Chinatrust Whales||5 – 8||Shen Yu-chieh||Chang Chih-chiang||Kevin Tolar||488
|- style="background:#bfb;"
||7 / 6||@ Chinatrust Whales||6 – 1||Brian Reith||Ni Fu-deh||||840
|- style="background:#bfb;"
||7 / 10||Macoto Cobras||13 – 4||Pete Munro||Jeremy Hill||||1,606
|- style="background:#bfb;"
||7 / 11||Macoto Cobras||2 – 1||Pan Wei-lun||Pat Ahearne||Tsao Chun-yang||2,006
|- style="background:#bfb;"
||7 / 14||@ Brother Elephants||3 – 0||Brian Reith||Liu Chun-nan||Tsao Chun-yang||3,626
|- style="background:#bfb;"
||7 / 15||@ Brother Elephants||9 – 2||Pete Munro||Yeh Yung-chieh||||3,029
|- style="background:#bfb;"
||7 / 19||Brother Elephants||9 – 4||Brian Reith||Joey Dawley||||2,621
|- style="background:#bfb;"
||7 / 24||Sinon Bulls||4 – 2||Pete Munro||Tomokazu Iba||||1,121
|- style="background:#bfb;"
||7 / 25||Sinon Bulls||11 – 4||Pan Wei-lun||Yusuke Kurita||||1,702
|- style="background:#bfb;"
||7 / 28||@ Macoto Cobras||9 – 6||Brian Reith||Chang Hsien-chih||Tsao Chun-yang||2,078
|- style="background:#fcc;"
||7 / 29||@ Macoto Cobras||2 – 3||Jeremy Hill||Tseng Yi-cheng||||2,038
|- style="background:#fcc;"
||7 / 31||@ Chinatrust Whales||3 – 4||Kevin Tolar||Tsao Chun-yang||||879
|-

|- style="background:#bfb;"
||8 / 1||@ Chinatrust Whales||8 – 5||Chang Chih-chiang||Ni Fu-deh||Tsao Chun-yang||712
|- style="background:#bfb;"
||8 / 2||@ Sinon Bulls||7 – 1||Brian Reith||Yang Chien-fu||||1,957
|- style="background:#bfb;"
||8 / 3||@ Sinon Bulls||6 – 0||Pete Munro||Tsai Chung-nan||||1,988
|- style="background:#bfb;"
||8 / 7||@ Sinon Bulls||17 – 6||Lin Cheng-feng||Yang Chien-fu||Tsai Shih-chin||1,258
|- style="background:#bfb;"
||8 / 8||@ Sinon Bulls||8 – 2||Brian Reith||Tsai Chung-nan||||1,515
|- style="background:#bbb;"
||8 / 9||@ Brother Elephants||colspan=5|Postponed Rescheduled for October 2
|- style="background:#bbb;"
||8 / 10||@ Brother Elephants||colspan=5|Postponed Rescheduled for October 3
|- style="background:#fcc;"
||8 / 16||Macoto Cobras||5 – 6||Travis Minix||Tsao Chun-yang||||1,450
|- style="background:#bbb;"
||8 / 17||Macoto Cobras||colspan=5|Postponed Rescheduled for October 5
|- style="background:#bbb;"
||8 / 18||La New Bears||colspan=5|Postponed Rescheduled for October 8
|- style="background:#bbb;"
||8 / 19||La New Bears||colspan=5|Postponed Rescheduled for October 10
|- style="background:#bbb;"
||8 / 21||@ Brother Elephants||colspan=5|Postponed Rescheduled for September 14
|- style="background:#bbb;"
||8 / 22||@ Brother Elephants||colspan=5|Postponed Rescheduled for September 28
|- style="background:#bfb;"
||8 / 23||@ La New Bears||13 – 7||Brian Reith||Gary Rath||||1,030
|- style="background:#bbb;"
||8 / 24||@ La New Bears||colspan=5|Postponed Rescheduled for October 9
|- style="background:#bfb;"
||8 / 30||Chinatrust Whales||5 – 0||Pete Munro||Ni Fu-deh||||1,134
|- style="background:#fcc;"
||8 / 31||Chinatrust Whales||1 – 3||Shen Yu-chieh||Chang Chih-chiang||Kevin Tolar||1,145
|-

|- style="background:#fcc;"
||9 / 1||Macoto Cobras||1 – 6||Chang Hsien-chi||Brian Reith||||2,065
|- style="background:#bfb;"
||9 / 2||Macoto Cobras||10 – 1||Pan Wei-lun||Andy Van Hekken||||2,033
|- style="background:#fcc;"
||9 / 6||La New Bears||1 – 3||Hsu Yu-wei||Pete Munro||Mac Suzuki||1,522
|- style="background:#fcc;"
||9 / 7||La New Bears||1 – 2||Mac Suzuki||Tsao Chun-yang||||2,008
|- style="background:#fcc;"
||9 / 8||Sinon Bulls||0 – 5||Yusuke Kurita||Chang Chih-chiang||||2,323
|- style="background:#bfb;"
||9 / 9||Sinon Bulls||18 – 4||Pan Wei-lun||Hu Chun-chieh||||2,554
|- style="background:#bfb;"
||9 / 11||La New Bears||5 – 1||Pete Munro||Huang Chun-chung||||1,521
|- style="background:#fcc;"
||9 / 12||La New Bears||8 – 11||Mac Suzuki||Tsao Chun-yang||||1,564
|- style="background:#bfb;"
||9 / 14||@ Brother Elephants||10 – 1||Chang Chih-chiang||Liu Chun-nan||||1,284
|- style="background:#bfb;"
||9 / 15||@ Macoto Cobras||17 – 12||Nelson Figueroa||Carlos Castillo||||1,377
|- style="background:#bfb;"
||9 / 16||@ Macoto Cobras||4 – 1||Pete Munro||Lee Min-chin||Tsao Chun-yang||1,155
|- style="background:#bfb;"
||9 / 20||Brother Elephants||15 – 3||Nelson Figueroa||Yeh Yung-chieh||||1,225
|- style="background:#bfb;"
||9 / 21||Brother Elephants||3 – 0||Pan Wei-lun||Wu Pao-hsien||||2,139
|- style="background:#bfb;"
||9 / 25||Sinon Bulls||11 – 3||Pete Munro||Alfredo Gonzalez||||1,691
|- style="background:#bfb;"
||9 / 26||Sinon Bulls||6 – 4||Nelson Figueroa||Yusuke Kurita||||1,270
|- style="background:#fcc;"
||9 / 28||@ Brother Elephatns||3 – 5||Wu Pao-hsien||Chang Chih-chiang||Todd Moser||1,721
|- style="background:#fcc;"
||9 / 29||@ Chinatrust Whales||5 – 6||Lorenzo Barceló||Tsao Chun-yang||||1,178
|- style="background:#fcc;"
||9 / 30||@ Chinatrust Whales||1 – 0||Ni Fu-deh||Pete Munro||||1,249
|-

|- style="background:#bfb;"
||10 / 2||@ Brother Elephants||8 – 2||Nelson Figueroa||Joey Dawley||||1,388
|- style="background:#fcc;"
||10 / 3||@ Brother Elephants||3 – 7||Chuang Wei-chuan||Brian Reith||Todd Moser||2,061
|- style="background:#bfb;"
||10 / 5||Macoto Cobras||12 – 11||Pan Chun-jung||Andy Van Hekken||Tsai Shih-chin||1,068
|- style="background:#bfb;"
||10 / 8||La New Bears||10 – 2||Pan Wei-lun||Hsu Yu-wei||||1,548
|- style="background:#fcc;"
||10 / 9||@ La New Bears||4 – 15||Andrew Lorraine||Pete Munro||||3,073
|- style="background:#fcc;"
||10 / 10||La New Bears||1 – 4||Huang Chun-chung||Brian Reith||Mac Suzuki||6,263
|-

Post Season

Asia Series

See also
2007 Chinese Professional Baseball League season

Chinese Professional Baseball League season